The British Music Experience is a permanent exhibition in the Cunard Building on Liverpool's waterfront. It began as an exhibition, taking up more than 20,000 square feet, installed into The O2 Bubble, part of The O2 in Greenwich, London. Opened with a private concert by The View in March 2009, it featured a retrospective look at the British music industry since 1944. The museum closed on 30 April 2014 and announced it was looking for a new home.  On 10 September 2015 it was confirmed that the new home for the British Music Experience would be the Cunard Building on Liverpool's waterfront.

Spearheaded by music mogul Harvey Goldsmith, designed by Land Design Studio and funded by The O2 owners AEG, BME was created to fill a gap in the UK Heritage sector for Rock and Pop Music. Previously, the National Centre for Popular Music in Sheffield had attempted to achieve this but failed to attract visitors and was eventually closed.

The British Music Experience has been set up as a charitable trust and has been funded by £9.5m worth of investment from AEG who hoped to recoup their costs within five years. Sponsorship agreements with The Performing Rights Society, Gibson Guitars and Sennheiser amongst others have helped establish the exhibition. In 2010 the UK's fifth biggest food retailer, The Co-operative Group, signed on as the exhibition's main sponsor, pledging to give away 15,000 tickets over the next three years.

Galleries

The history of popular music in the UK is told through a narrative divided up into galleries with common components. The zones effectively work together to provide a timeline of the British popular music story from 1945 until the present day. They are not broken down into convenient decades but represent actual moments of change that occurred so frequently over the 70-year duration of our narrative. Within those moments of change genres evolve.

There is an interactive timeline in each of the galleries. Each of these has a projected matrix of events with a foreground interface that provides access to in depth digital material. The user is able to scan and select across the whole timeline to select an event which reveals magazine style headlines, images and movies.

Major interactive exhibits which can be found in the museum's galleries include:

 Showcases and Timelines
 Hey DJ!
 Where It's At
 Anatomy of a Pop Star
 Gibson Interactive Studio
 The Great Divide
 Dance The Decades
 Table Talk
 Atlantic Crossing
 Transmission
 Playback

Many of these interactive exhibits have been developed by specialist software suppliers Clay Interactive Ltd, iso design and Studio Simple with consultation from a curatorial team including Robert Santelli, who worked on other major music exhibits such as The Rock and Roll Hall of Fame in Cleveland, Ohio and The Grammy Museum in Los Angeles. The initial BME curator Paul Lilley, with Sarah Clark and Laura Bailey, were responsible for the extensive number of artefacts and exhibits on view and the rest of the BME content team was made up of music consultants Rob Dickins, David Roberts and Mark Ellen.

Artefacts and Memorabilia 
The BME has an extensive collection of rock and pop artefacts used to curate the rich history of popular British music alongside a social and political backdrop. 
 600+ stage outfits, instruments, hand-written lyrics, and other objects brought to life with interactivity.
 6000 images & video clips embedded in a digital timeline and archive 
 Musical movements mirroring social history, politics, geography and technology in the UK. 
							
						The collection is the only comprehensive collection that charts the rise of British Popular Music from its roots in jazz to the present day.
 
Highlights of some of the artefacts that can be found at the British Music Experience include:
 Some of Elton John's glasses
 Five Spice Girls outfits
 Humphrey Lyttelton's VE-Day trumpet
 David Bowie's Ziggy Stardust costume
 Noel Gallagher's Union Jack guitar
 Iron Maiden's Eddie the Head Icon
 Roger Daltrey's outfit from a gig at Woodstock
 Amy Winehouse's dress from her 'Tears Dry on Their Own' video
 Guitars from Keith Richards, Bill Wyman, Pete Townshend, Brian May, Jamie Cook and Paul Weller

Interactive Instrument Studio 
The instrument studio allows visitors to play a wide range of musical instruments including electric guitars and drums, and even mix a music track. Here you can engage with an onscreen lesson from say KT Tunstall on how to finger the chords of her favourite hit song. Following this you can play along with her video of the track. Users of this space do not need any previous skills.

Learning and public programmes 
The BME regularly hosts learning and public programmes and temporary exhibitions to delve deeper into a band's artistry or music trends and movements. Past events and exhibitions have included:

Bon Jovi: Master class/gig
The Faces: Master class/gig
Emile Sande: Master class
Frank Turner: Master class
Imogen Heap: Master class
Rudimental: Master class
Daniel Kramer: Photographs Of Bob Dylan
Rip This Joint: The Rolling Stones 1972. Photographs by Jim Marshall
Messenger: Bob Marley Exhibition
Rated R: Rihanna Exhibition

BME offers interactive workshops and seminars for schools tied to key stage objectives in the National Curriculum, including subjects such as geography, ICT, citizenship, careers, design and pop culture.

See also 
 List of music museums

References

External links
 
 Anschutz Entertainment Group Official website
 Harvey Goldsmith Official website
 Sky at The O2 Official website

Music museums in Liverpool
Museums established in 2009
Museums in the Royal Borough of Greenwich
Defunct museums in London